Panolopus marcanoi, commonly known as Marcano's galliwasp or Pico Duarte galliwasp, is a species of lizard in the family Diploglossidae. It is endemic to the Dominican Republic.

Taxonomic history 
The type series was collected by the Dominican herpetologist Sixto J. Inchaustegui, who collected a series of 18 specimens in 1971 during an ascent to Pico Duarte.  It was later described by Albert Schwartz and Sixto J. Inchaustegui in the Journal of Herpetology, published by: Society for the Study of Amphibians and Reptiles.

The type locality is "Valle de Bao, 1800 m, Cordillera Central (road to Pico Duarte), Santiago Province, República Dominicana".

It was formerly classified in the genus Celestus, but was moved to Panolopus in 2021.

Etymology 
The specific epithet, marcanoi, is in honor of the Dominican botanist, entomologist, herpetologist, speleologist and researcher Eugenio de Jesús Marcano Fondeur.

Morphology 
A small species of Panolopus (maximum snout-vent length: 78 mm), with relatively long limbs, and with smooth (without keels) dorsal scales.

Dorsal ground color pale-brown to dark-brown, with scattered, longitudinally aligned darker dots or dashes. These can be oriented as chevrons or chevron fragments, which can form longitudinal lines in the anterior portions of the dorsum. A dark face mask is present, extending posteriorly on lateral surfaces while gradually fading and disappearing after forelimbs. 

Venter is gray, devoid of any conspicuous pattern, except for occasional, diffuse, dark blotches on throat and chest.

Distribution 
This species is endemic to Valle de Bao, a relatively small valley located on the northern slope of the Cordillera Central.

Ecology 
A terrestrial, semi-fossorial species. During the day, specimen have been found underneath stones, boulders and rubble, where they have been found to be relatively abundant.

The habitat can be described as an alpine savannah, which is dominated by the endemic grass Danthonia domingensis, surrounded by dense pine forests composed of Pinus occidentalis, another endemic. Although this species has only been found within the grassland habitat, it is possible that it also inhabits surrounding pine forests, but further research is necessary.

Conservation 
According to the most recent IUCN Red List assessment, P. marcanoi is listed as Least Concern  (LC). Although the distribution of C. marcanoi is very restricted (with an estimated range of less than 120 km²), it is known to occur in a well protected area (Armando Bermudez National Park), and no threats have been identified to the present date. The population trends are not known.

References 

Panolopus
Reptiles described in 1976
Lizards
Reptiles of the Dominican Republic
Endemic fauna of the Dominican Republic